Marta Moreno Remírez is a retired Spanish football defender, whose last club was Athletic Bilbao in Spain's Primera División.

She was a member of the Spanish national team.

Honours
Athletic Bilbao
Superliga Femenina: 2004–05, 2006–07

Lagunak
Primera Nacional (second tier): 2002–03

References

1982 births
Living people
Spanish women's footballers
Spain women's international footballers
Primera División (women) players
Athletic Club Femenino players
Footballers from Pamplona
Women's association football defenders
SD Lagunak (women) players
21st-century Spanish women